The adjective Hanoverian is used to describe:
 British monarchs or supporters of the House of Hanover, the dynasty which ruled the United Kingdom from 1714 to 1901
 things relating to;
 Electorate of Hanover
 Kingdom of Hanover
 Province of Hanover
 things relating to the City of Hanover, Germany
 Hanoverian horse, a horse breed